Pedro Pablo Figueroa Luna (December 25, 1857 in Copiapó, Chile – January 4, 1909 in Santiago) was a Chilean writer and researcher. Among his works is the Diccionario biográfico de Chile, first published in 1887.

Bibliography
Biografía de don Benjamín Vicuña Mackenna (1884)
Tradiciones y leyendas (1885)
Apuntes históricos (1885)
Galería de escritores chilenos (1885)
La sombra del genio (1885)
Diccionario biográfico de Chile (1887)
Estudios históricos Sudamericanos (1890)
Diccionario biográfico de extranjeros 1890)
Los principios del liberalismo democrático (1893)
Vida del general José Francisco Vergara Gana (1894)
La librería de Chile (1894)
Reseña histórica de la literatura chilena (1900)
Album Militar (1903)
Rómulo Mandiola, su vida y sus escritos inéditos (1903)
Historia de la fundación del carbón de piedra (1908)
Biografía de don Jorge Rojas Miranda (1908)
Antología chilena (1908)

References

External links
Biography 
Downloadable Diccionario biográfico de Chile 

1857 births
1909 deaths
Chilean male writers